Roger Dickson Farm is a historic farm and national historic district located near Magnolia, Duplin County, North Carolina. The district encompasses three contributing buildings and one contributing site. They are the Robert Dickson House, the kitchen building, the corn crib, and the land, consisting of cultivated fields and forest.  The house was built about 1815–1818, and enlarged about 1850.  It is a vernacular North Carolina "coastal cottage" style dwelling with an open foundation, a tall gable roof, and a deep, full-width engaged porch.

It was added to the National Register of Historic Places in 1988.

References

Farms on the National Register of Historic Places in North Carolina
Historic districts on the National Register of Historic Places in North Carolina
Houses completed in 1818
Houses in Duplin County, North Carolina
National Register of Historic Places in Duplin County, North Carolina